Chips is a residential apartment building, alongside the Ashton Canal, in New Islington, Manchester, England. Historically part of Ancoats, the building is part of an urban renewal project, New islington Millennium Village in east Manchester which has been led by Urban Splash.

Chips is a nine-storey building and was designed by the architect Will Alsop, founder of Alsop Architects. The structural engineers where Civic Engineers. Tom Bloxham of Urban Splash requested that the building be away from "mundanity", and came up with Chips with Alsop.

In January 2018 Chips failed a Greater Manchester Fire and Rescue Service risk assessment and the cladding on the building was found to have "non fire retardant" written on it.

Background
Chips is part of the New Islington regeneration project east of Manchester city centre.

References

External links

Chips at Urban Splash

Will Alsop buildings
Apartment buildings in England
Residential buildings completed in 2009
Residential buildings in Manchester